XHOB-FM is a radio station on 96.1 FM in San Luis Potosí, San Luis Potosí. It is owned by MG Radio and is known as Factor 96.1 with a pop format.

History
XHOB received its concession on September 20, 1971. It was owned by Benjamin Orozco Barba. Centri Radio acquired it in 1982, and Radiocomunicación Enfocada picked it up in 1992.

References

Radio stations in San Luis Potosí